Theodor Bua was a 15th-century Albanian military commander who served as a captain of the stradioti regiments of the Republic of Venice.

Biography
After the Venetian-Ottoman peace treaty of 1479, that gave to the Ottomans the last free part of Albania, areas of Peloponnesus and Dalmatia (Albania Veneta), Theodore Bua defected from the Venetian army and joined the rebellion of Krokodeilos Kladas in the Morea. In his Dispacci al Senato e ad Altri, Bartolomeo Minio describes an incident in which the Venetian commander of Nafplio sent an Albanian contingent against him and Meksha Buziqi but the soldiers refused to attack them because of their kinship ties and compatriotism. The rebellion ultimately failed after the two commanders broke their alliance. Afterwards, Bua returned to Venetian territory but was jailed in Monemvasia.

See also
Bua family

References

Citations

Sources

Republic of Venice military personnel
15th-century Venetian people
t
15th-century Albanian people